Limnochori (before 1928: Στριγκλέικα - Strigkleika) is a village and a community in the municipal unit of Movri in Achaea, Greece. The community consists of the villages Limnochori, Kalamaki, Kato Limnochori and Paralia Kalamakiou. It is located in the plains near the Gulf of Patras. It is 4 km north of Sageika, 4 km southeast of Lakkopetra, 6 km west of Kato Achaia and 4 km east of Araxos Airport.

Population

See also
List of settlements in Achaea

References

Populated places in Achaea